The 2020–21 Saint Francis Red Flash men's basketball team represented Saint Francis University during the 2020–21 NCAA Division I men's basketball season. The Red Flash, led by ninth-year head coach Rob Krimmel, play their home games at the DeGol Arena in Loretto, Pennsylvania as members of the Northeast Conference.

Previous season
The Red Flash finished the 2019–20 season 22–10, 13–5 in NEC play to finish in a share for second place. They defeated Bryant  and Sacred Heart to reach the championship game of the NEC tournament where they lost to Robert Morris. With 22 wins, they were a candidate for postseason play. However, all postseason tournaments were cancelled amid the COVID-19 pandemic.

Roster

Schedule and results

|-
!colspan=9 style=| Non-conference regular season

|-
!colspan=9 style=| NEC regular season

References

Saint Francis Red Flash men's basketball seasons
Saint Francis (PA)
Saint Francis
Saint Francis